Ernst Moldenhauer was a German fencer. He competed in the individual épée and sabre events at the 1908 Summer Olympics.

References

Year of birth missing
Year of death missing
German male fencers
Olympic fencers of Germany
Fencers at the 1908 Summer Olympics
20th-century German people